The 2013 O'Higgins F.C. season is O'Higgins F.C.'s 50th season in the Primera División and their seventh consecutive season in Primera División. The club plays in two tournaments: The 2013 Primera División of Chile season and the Copa Chile.

Until February 2013, O'Higgins played its home matches at the Estadio El Teniente in Rancagua. On 19 February, the stadium was closed in order to begin its renovation process. The stadium will be expanded to 15,000 seats and is set to be a host venue for the 2015 Copa América. Meanwhile, O'Higgins will use the Estadio La Granja in Curicó as a temporary venue for home matches. Apart from this, the team played 2 of its home matches in Santiago.

O'Higgins finished the Torneo Transición in 4th position, having big chances of reaching the title until the end of the season. The club enlist this season as "a prelude" for the title won at the 2013–14 Torneo Apertura in late 2013. In Copa Chile, the team eliminated Colo-Colo and managed to reach the Quarterfinals, where they lost to Cobreloa by a single goal.

The season covers the period from 1 January to 31 May 2013. This article also includes the Copa Chile, despite the competition started in 23 June 2012, as the team progressed to the knockout stages that were held during this season.

Friendly matches

Torneo Transición

League table

Results summary

Result round by round

Matches

Copa Chile

Group stage

Knockout stage
Round of 16

Quarterfinals

References

O'Higgins F.C. seasons
O'Higgins